Balandougou may refer to:

Balandougou, Guinea
Balandougou, Mali